The 1882 New South Wales colonial election was for 113 members representing 72 electoral districts. The election was conducted on the basis of a simple majority or first-past-the-post voting system. In this election there were 32 multi-member districts returning 73 members and 40 single member districts. In the multi-member districts each elector could vote for as many candidates as there were vacancies. 13 districts were uncontested. There was no recognisable party structure at this election. The average number of enrolled voters per seat was 1,701, ranging from East Maitland (984) to Wentworth (2,977).

The electoral boundaries were established under the Electoral Act 1880 (NSW), which provided that a district would return a second member if the electoral roll reached 3,000, a third member upon reaching 5,000 and a fourth member on reaching 8,000. At this election there were five districts which returned an additional member, Balmain, Bourke, Canterbury, Redfern and St Leonards.

Election results

Albury

Argyle

Balmain

| colspan="2"   |  
	| colspan="2" style="text-align:center;" | (1 new seat)

Balranald

Bathurst

The Bogan

Boorowa

Bourke

| colspan="2"   |  
	| colspan="2" style="text-align:center;" | (1 new seat)

Braidwood

Camden

Canterbury

| colspan="2"   |  
	| colspan="2" style="text-align:center;" | (1 new seat)

Joseph Mitchell had previously been defeated as a sitting member for Newtown.

Carcoar

The Clarence

Central Cumberland

Durham

East Macquarie

East Maitland

East Sydney

A sitting member Henry Dangar did not contest the election. Edmund Barton was the member for Wellington and John McElhone was the member for Upper Hunter where he was re-elected. McElhone subsequently resigned from East Sydney causing a by-election. Sir Henry Parkes subsequently nominated for both St Leonards and then Tenterfield where he was elected unopposed. Parkes then withdrew from St Leonards.

Eden

Forbes

Sitting member John Bodel did not contest the election.

The Glebe

Glen Innes

Gloucester

Sitting member Archibald Jacob unsuccessfully contested Morpeth.

Goulburn

Grafton

Grenfell

Gundagai

Bruce Smith had been successful at a by-election on 23 November 1882 however parliament was dissolved on the same day and he could not take his seat.

Gunnedah

The Gwydir

Hartley

The sitting member Robert Abbott did not contest the election.

The Hastings and Manning

The other sitting member Joseph Andrews did not contest the election.

The Hawkesbury

The Hume

The Hunter

Illawarra

James Watson had been unsuccessful in retaining his seat in Young.

Inverell

Kiama

The Macleay

Molong

Monaro

Morpeth

Archibald Jacob was the sitting member for Gloucester.

Mudgee

A sitting member Louis Beyers did not contest the election.

The Murray

A sitting member William Hay did not contest the election.

The Murrumbidgee

The Namoi

The Nepean

New England

The sitting member Henry Copeland successfully contested Newtown. James Farnell was a sitting member for St Leonards and had already unsuccessfully contested Parramatta.

Newcastle

Newtown

Henry Copeland was the member for New England to challenge William Foster, the Minister for Justice. Joseph Mitchell subsequently contested Canterbury but was again unsuccessful.

Northumberland

The other sitting member Thomas Hungerford unsuccessfully contested Upper Hunter.

Orange

The other sitting member Andrew Kerr did not contest the election.

Paddington

The other sitting member William Hezlet did not contest the election.

Parramatta

The sitting member Charles Byrnes did not contest the election. James Farnell was a sitting member for St Leonards and went on to successfully contest New England.

Patrick's Plains

The sitting member John Brown did not contest the election.

Queanbeyan

The sitting member Thomas Rutledge did not contest the election.

Redfern

| colspan="2"   |  
	| colspan="2" style="text-align:center;" | (1 new seat)

The Richmond

The sitting member Charles Fawcett did not contest the election.

Shoalhaven

South Sydney

Sydney Burdekin was a sitting member for Tamworth.

St Leonards

| colspan="2"   |  
	| colspan="2" style="text-align:center;" | (1 new seat)

Sitting member James Farnell unsuccessfully contested Parramatta and subsequently successfully contested New England. After Sir Henry Parkes unsuccessfully contested East Sydney and nominated for both St Leonards and then Tenterfield where he was elected unopposed. Parkes then withdrew from St Leonards.

Tamworth

The other sitting member Sydney Burdekin unsuccessfully contested South Sydney.

Tenterfield

The sitting member Augustus Fraser did not contest the election. Sir Henry Parkes unsuccessfully contested East Sydney and nominated for both St Leonards and then Tenterfield. Parkes then withdrew from St Leonards.

Tumut

Arthur Renwick had previously unsuccessfully contested East Sydney.

The Upper Hunter

John McElhone had already been elected for East Sydney. Thomas Hungerford was a sitting member for Northumberland.

Wellington

The sitting member Edmund Barton successfully contested East Sydney.

Wentworth

West Macquarie

The sitting member Charles Pilcher unsuccessfully contested West Sydney.

West Maitland

The sitting member James Fulford did not contest the election.

West Sydney

Wollombi

Yass Plains

Young

The other sitting member William Watson did not contest the election. James Watson was subsequently unsuccessful in contesting Illawarra.

See also 

 Candidates of the 1882 New South Wales colonial election
 Members of the New South Wales Legislative Assembly, 1882–1885

References 

1882